The 1968 Wisconsin gubernatorial election was held on November 5, 1968.   Republican Warren P. Knowles won the election with 53% of the vote, winning his third term as Governor of Wisconsin and defeating Democrat Bronson La Follette.

Results

Notes

References

1968
Wisconsin
1968 Wisconsin elections